Fredrik Gade may refer to:
 Fredrik Georg Gade (businessman) (1830–1905), Norwegian businessman and politician
 Fredrik Georg Gade (1855–1933), his son, Norwegian physician
 Fredrik Herman Gade (1871–1943),  Norwegian-American attorney and diplomat